In enzymology, a hydroxylysine kinase is an enzyme that catalyzes the chemical reaction

GTP + 5-hydroxy-L-lysine  GDP + 5-phosphonooxy-L-lysine

Thus, the two substrates of this enzyme are GTP and 5-hydroxy-L-lysine, whereas its two products are GDP and 5-phosphonooxy-L-lysine.

This enzyme belongs to the family of transferases, specifically those transferring phosphorus-containing groups (phosphotransferases) with an alcohol group as acceptor.  The systematic name of this enzyme class is GTP:5-hydroxy-L-lysine O-phosphotransferase. Other names in common use include hydroxylysine kinase (phosphorylating), and guanosine triphosphate:5-hydroxy-L-lysine O-phosphotransferase.  This enzyme participates in lysine degradation.

References

 

EC 2.7.1
Enzymes of unknown structure